Bottanuco is a comune (municipality) in the Province of Bergamo in the Italian region of Lombardy, located about  northeast of Milan and about  southwest of Bergamo.

The municipality of Bottanuco contains the frazione (subdivision) Cerro.

Bottanuco borders the following municipalities: Capriate San Gervasio, Chignolo d'Isola, Cornate d'Adda, Filago, Madone, Suisio, Trezzo sull'Adda.

Demographic evolution

References